Oriole is an unincorporated community in Somerset County, Maryland, United States. Oriole is located at the intersection of Maryland Route 627 and Jerusalem Road, west of Princess Anne. The William S. Smith House was listed on the National Register of Historic Places in 1991.

Notable person
Joe Muir, baseball player.

References

Unincorporated communities in Somerset County, Maryland
Unincorporated communities in Maryland
Maryland populated places on the Chesapeake Bay